The Museum of Islamic Art (MIA) is a museum on one end of the  Corniche in Doha, Qatar. As per the architect I. M. Pei's specifications, the museum is built on an island off an artificial projecting peninsula near the traditional dhow harbor. A purpose-built park surrounds the edifice on the eastern and southern facades while two bridges connect the southern front facade of the property with the main peninsula that holds the park. The western and northern facades are marked by the harbor showcasing the Qatari seafaring past. In September 2017, Qatar Museums appointed Julia Gonnella as new director of MIA.

Facilities
The museum hosts the restaurant IDAM led by the head chef Alain Ducasse. The restaurant is inspired by French Mediterranean cuisine. IDAM also offers master classes in cooking artisanal bread and raw foods. The museum has a park, workshops for schools and the general public, and a library that provides information about Islamic Arts in both English and Arabic. The library also has nine study rooms.

Adjacent to the museum is the MIA Park, a waterfront open space administered by the museum. It features cafes, a children's play area, and 7, a vertical steel sculpture by American sculptor Richard Serra.

Architecture 
The museum is influenced by ancient Islamic architecture yet has a uniquely modern design involving geometric patterns. It is the first of its kind to feature over 14 centuries of Islamic art in the Arab States of the Persian Gulf.

Construction of the building was done by a Turkish company, Baytur Construction, in 2006. The interior gallery spaces were designed by a team of Wilmotte Associates. The museum was opened on November 22, 2008, by the then-emir of Qatar, Sheikh Hamad. It opened to the general public on December 8, 2008.

At 91 years of age, the museum's architect, I. M. Pei had to be coaxed out of retirement to undertake this enterprise. He traveled throughout the Muslim world on a six-month quest to learn about Muslim architecture and history and read Muslim texts to draw inspiration for his design. According to Pei, the light fountain in 9th century Ibn Tulun Mosque of Cairo was the inspiration.

Declining all proposed sites for the museum, he suggested a stand-alone island for the structure to avoid encroachments by other buildings in the future. Pei requested that the museum spaces be designed by his collaborator on the Louvre project, Wilmotte & Associates, who then assembled a design team including Plowden & Smith (conservation consultants), Isometrix Lighting + Design (lighting consultants), and SG Conseil (AV Consultants) under Turner Projacs. Along with this design team, Leslie E. Robertson Associates was the structural engineer for the project.

The main building consists of the five floors, the main dome, and the central tower. It is connected with the education ward via a large central court. Pei utilized creamy limestone for the outer facades to emphasize the various shades during the different times of the day. The five floors are covered by a glass facade to the north, and it provides a panoramic view of the Persian Gulf. The interior of the building is decorated by several Islamic arts, and the large metallic chandelier hung over the main staircase of the lobby. Many elements found in Ibn Tulun Mosque are represented in the building as an abstract form. This enables the agreement with values and principles of the postmodern architecture historical trend which synchronize the modernity and the historical Islamic architectural identity.

Renovation 2022 
As preparation for the 2022 FIFA World Cup, the Museum of Islamic Art announced in June 2021 that it would be closed for renovation works until autumn 2022, to upgrade its main entrance, galleries, lecture hall and further indoor spaces. In June 2022 MIA Director Julia Gonnella introduced the museum's revised concept of an 'immersive cultural experience' to attract additional visitors and to enable families and young visitors to explore Islamic art. In August 2022 the official reopening date was confirmed for 5 October 2022 with an increased number of more than 1,100 mostly newly acquired exhibits on display. The renovations provided better accessibility and an improved educational environment including digital presentations and subjects interesting to younger visitors. The museum also added a 3-D tour to its website. 

The museum reopened on 4 October 2022, during the National Cultural Event of "Qatar Creative", which provides an opportunity to bring together Qatar's creative industries with the wider public community. Its 18 newly renovated galleries, covering an area of 480,000 square feet, display Islamic art from the seventh to the 20th centuries, divided according to their historical eras and their cultural and geographical backgrounds, which allows visitors of modern Doha an extended insight into Islamic history. The renovated museum's first exhibition, Baghdad: Eye's Delight presents the traditions and history of Iraq's capital. The exhibition includes also objects loaned from the Metropolitan Museum of Art in New York and the Louvre in Paris.

Collection 
The Museum of Islamic Art represents Islamic art from three continents over 1,400 years. Its collection includes metal work, ceramics, jewelry, wood work, textiles, and glass obtained from three continents and dating from the 7th to the 20th century.

The museum houses a collection of work gathered since the late 1980s including manuscripts, textiles and ceramics. It is one of the world's most complete collections of Islamic artifacts, with items originating in Spain, Egypt, Iran, Iraq, Turkey, India, and Central Asia.

Manuscripts
An important Quranic manuscript within the collection is MS.474.2003.

Exhibitions 
Exhibitions organized by MIA include:

 Ferozkoh: Tradition and Continuity in Afghan Art, March 2013 to July 2013.
 Steel and Gold – Historic Swords from the MIA collection, May 2013 to December 2013.
 Hajj: The Journey through Art, October 2013 to January 2014.
 Radiant, January 2014 to March 2014.
 Kings & Pawns: Board Board Games from India to Spain, March 2014 to June 2014.
 Ceramics of al-Andalus from April 2014 to August 2014.
 The Tiger's Dream: Tipu Sultan, September 2014 to February 2015.
 Mughal and Safavid Albums, September 2014 to February 2015.
 Marvellous Creatures: Animal Fables in Islamic Art, March 2015 to July 2015.
 The Hunt: Princely Pursuits in Islamic Lands, September 2015 to January 2016.
 Qajar Women: Images of Women in the 19th century Iran, April 2015 to June 2016.
 Muhammad Ali: Tribute to a Legend, July 2016 to February 2017.
 Imperial Threads: Motifs and artisans from Turkey, Iran and India, March 2017 to January 2018.
 Powder and Damask: Islamic Arms and Armour from the Collection of Fadel Al-Mansoori, August 2017 to May 2018.
 Syria Matters, November 2018 to April 2019.
 Set in Stone: Gems and Jewels from Royal Indian Courts, October 2019 to January 2020.
 A Falcon's Eye - Tribute to Sheikh Saoud Al Thani, August 2020 to April 2021.
 Baghdad: Eye’s Delight, October 2022 to February 2023.
 Safar, October 2022 to January 2023.
 Raku Kichizaemon XV·Jikinyū: A Living Tradition of Japanese Pottery, November 2022 to March 2023.
 Yayoi Kusama: My Soul Blooms Forever, November 2022 to March 2023.
 City of Mirage: Baghdad, from Wright to Venturi, 1952-1982, October 2022 to February 2023.

Gallery

See also
List of museums in Qatar

References

External links

Virtual tour of the Museum of Islamic Art, Doha provided by Google Arts & Culture

Museum of Islamic Art, Doha
Art museums established in 2008
Art museums and galleries in Qatar
Decorative arts museums
Islamic museums
Museum of Islamic Art, Doha
Museum of Islamic Art, Doha
Textile museums
Buildings and structures in Doha
Religious museums in Qatar